The Royal Commission into Defence and Veteran Suicide is a royal commission established on 8 July 2021 by the Australian government pursuant to the Royal Commissions Act 1902.  The Royal Commissioners are required to provide an interim report by 11 August 2022, and a final report by 15 June 2023.

Background
On 22 March 2021 both chambers of the Australian Parliament passed motions in support of a Royal Commission into defence and veteran suicide.
The government had resisted calls for such a broad-ranging and powerful inquiry, preferring the option of establishing a National Commissioner for Defence and Veteran Suicide Prevention.

The Royal Commission into Defence and Veteran Suicide was established on 8 July 2021 by Letters Patent, pursuant to the Royal Commissions Act 1902.  The Letters Patent appoint Mr Nick Kaldas , The Hon. James Douglas  and Dr Peggy Brown  as Royal Commissioners.

Powers

Royal Commissions have powers to issue a summons to a person to appear before the Commission at a hearing to give evidence or to produce documents specified in the summons; require witnesses to take an oath or give an affirmation; and require a person to deliver documents to the Commission at a specified place and time. A person served with a summons or a notice to produce documents must comply with that requirement, or face prosecution for an offence. A Royal Commission may authorise the Australian Federal Police to execute search warrants.

Hearings
Hearings began in November 2021 with 6 hearings held around Australia before the release of the interim report in August 2022.

Reports
The Commissioners are required to produce an interim report by 11 August 2022 and a final report by 15 June 2023.

Interim report
The interim report was released on 11 August 2022 and included 13 recommendations. Of the 13 recommendations 8 related to how the Royal Commission operated and 5 relating to the claims process at the Department of Veteran's Affairs which, as of the end of May 2011, had a backlog of nearly 42,000 claims for compensation. Kaldas said that lives and livelihoods depend on getting providing assistance as soon as possible. The interim report also identified that, since 2000, there have been 50 reports containing over 750 recommendations relevant to the suicide and potential suicide of veterans.

The Minister for Veterans' Affairs, Matt Keogh responded to the interim report by stating that the department had started the process of hiring 500 people to help clear the current claims backlog saying, calling it a national tragedy, and saying

See also

List of Australian royal commissions

References

External links
 of the Royal Commission into Defence and Veteran Suicide.
 Interim report of the Royal Commission

Commonwealth of Australia royal commissions
2021 establishments in Australia
2021 in Australia
Morrison Government